Ganodermanontriol is a lanostanoid triterpene isolated from Ganoderma lucidum.

References

Steroids